is a form of karate that was founded in 1933 by .

The Naming of Shindo Jinen Ryu 

Konishi believed that if one lives a moral life, then one is naturally following the divine way. Extending this idea, he posited that, if training in karate in a natural way leads one to mastery of one's body, knowledge and experience are vastly increased and the foundation for naturally living a moral life is established. For this reason Konishi named his own style Shindō jinen-ryū ("godly, natural style, complete empty-handed way").

History and development
Prior to learning Karate, founder Yasuhiro Konishi had studied traditional Japanese martial arts at Takenouchi-ryū, Musō-ryū, Jikishinkage-ryū, Kyōshinmeichi-ryū, Ono-ha Ittō-ryū and Shindō Munen-ryū schools. In 1924, he began studying Karate under Gichin Funakoshi, and together with Hironori Otsuka (founder of Wado-ryu Karate), who was also a disciple of Funakoshi, whom with he would conceive practice of competitive Karate.

Subsequently, Konishi learned Karate from Motobu Choki and Kenwa Mabuni (founder of Shito-ryu Karate), and learned Aikido (then Daito-ryu Aikijujutsu) from Morihei Ueshiba. He would additionally learn Nanban Sattō-ryū Kenpō from Seiko Fujita, as well as go study Jiu-jitsu from Yōshin Koryū, Shiba Shin-Yo-ryu, Fusen-ryu, and Yagyu Shingan-ryu.

In 1933, he would compile all the techniques he had learned into Shindō jinen-ryū style. Konishi followed the path of karate and would teach that "Karate is based on the fact that no one hits you and no one hits you."

Characteristics 
Shindo Jinen Ryu training has three main elements: kihon (basics), kata (forms or patterns of moves) and kumite (sparring).  It incorporates elements of karate, aikido, jujitsu and kendo in its curriculum and also emphasizes both philosophy and education.  The strong influences of both Gichin Funakoshi and Kenwa Mabuni are apparent in the style.  The catalog of stances and techniques is equally broad, subsuming methods from both Shotokan and Shito-Ryu.  There is a strong focus on practicality and an approach that often combines entering strikes with finishing takedowns.

Kata 

Shindo Jinen Ryu has a large repertoire of kata, incorporating variations on the Shotokan catalog, a number of Shito-Ryu forms and a number of kata that are exclusive to Shindo Jinen Ryu.  Kobudo is also part of this element of the style's curriculum.

Organization 
Currently, Shindo Jinen-ryu has 15 branches in Japan and 15 overseas branches as the Japan Karatedo Ryobukai, and is active.

The Ryobukan Konishi Dojo of the Ryobukai General Headquarters was established by Yasuhiro Konishi, in 1927, before the founding of Shindo Jinen-Ryu. It has been used as a dojo for youth development before and after the war as a dojo for kendo, karate, and judo.

Following Yasuhiro Konishi's death on June 3, 1983, his eldest son, Takehiro Konishi, succeeded the second Soke.

In March 1985, the main dojo moved to KN Building at Shiba, Minato-ku, Tokyo. According to the "Monthly Karatedo" magazine specializing in karate, the Japanese domestic branches gather every year to hold the Ryobukan Tournament.

Sources 
 Japanese Karate, Volume 1: Shindo Jinen Ryu. [Motion Picture]. Thousand Oaks, CA: Tsunami Productions. 1998
 Japanese Karate, Volume 2: Ryobukai and Shotokan. [Motion Picture]. Thousand Oaks, CA: Tsunami Productions. 1998
 Japan Karate-Do Ryobu-Kai Instructors Manual. 1996

References

External links 
 http://www.ryobu-kai.com/
 http://www48.tok2.com/home/ryobukai/#/
 http://www.champ-shop.com/SHOP/BOK-391.html

Karate